Ibrahim Farhi Benhalima (born 16 April 1997) is an Algerian professional footballer who plays as a midfielder for MC Oujda.

Club career 
Benhalima made his professional debut for USM El Harrach on 19 September 2015.
In 2021, he joined ES Sétif. 
In 2022, he joined MC Oujda.

References

External links

1997 births
Living people
People from Saïda
Algerian footballers
Algeria youth international footballers
Association football midfielders
JS Saoura players
Algerian Ligue Professionnelle 1 players
21st-century Algerian people